606 Brangäne, provisional designation , is an asteroid from the central regions of the asteroid belt, approximately  in diameter. It was discovered on 18 September 1906, by astronomer August Kopff at the Heidelberg Observatory in southwest Germany. The unusual K-type asteroid is the namesake of the small Brangäne family and has a rotation period of 12.3 hours. It was named after Brangaine, a character from the opera Tristan und Isolde by Richard Wagner.

Orbit and classification 

Brangäne is the principal body of the stony Brangäne family, a small asteroid family of less than 200 known members. It orbits the Sun in the central main-belt at a distance of 2.0–3.2 AU once every 4 years and 2 months (1,520 days; semi-major axis of 2.59 AU). Its orbit has an eccentricity of 0.22 and an inclination of 9° with respect to the ecliptic.

Physical characteristics 

In the SMASS classification, Brangäne is an uncommon K-type asteroid, while in the Tholen classification its spectral type is ambiguous, closest to a T-type and somewhat similar to that of an S- and D-type.

Rotation period 

In November 2006, a rotational lightcurve of Brangäne was obtained from photometric observations by French amateur astronomers Raymond Poncy and René Roy. Lightcurve analysis gave a rotation period of  hours with a brightness amplitude of 0.20 magnitude.

Diameter and albedo 

According to the surveys carried out by the Infrared Astronomical Satellite IRAS, the Japanese Akari satellite and the NEOWISE mission of NASA's Wide-field Infrared Survey Explorer, Brangäne measures between 28.15 and 36.18 kilometers in diameter and its surface has an albedo between 0.096 and 0.13. The Collaborative Asteroid Lightcurve Link adopts an albedo of 0.1075 and a diameter of 36.96 kilometers, based on an absolute magnitude of 10.2, from Petr Pravec's revised WISE-data.

Naming 

This minor planet was named after Brangaine, a character from the opera Tristan und Isolde by Richard Wagner. The official naming citation was mentioned in The Names of the Minor Planets by Paul Herget in 1955.

References

External links 
 Asteroid Lightcurve Database (LCDB), query form (info )
 Dictionary of Minor Planet Names, Google books
 Asteroids and comets rotation curves, CdR – Observatoire de Genève, Raoul Behrend
 Discovery Circumstances: Numbered Minor Planets (1)-(5000) – Minor Planet Center
 
 

000606
Discoveries by August Kopff
Named minor planets
606 Brangäne
000606
000606
19060918